Romel Roberto Beck-Castro (born May 29, 1982) is a Mexican professional basketball player who last played for Aguacateros de Michoacan of the Liga Nacional de Baloncesto Profesional (LNPB). He also played for the Mexico national basketball team.

Beck is probably best known for crossing over Kobe Bryant and scoring a rare four-point play against the USA Men's basketball guard during the 2007 FIBA Americas Championship.

After having decided against playing for KK Zadar of Croatia, Beck signed to play for Los Tecos of Universidad Autónoma de Guadalajara of the Mexican Basketball Federation in 2008 for two months.

Beck previously played in Italy with Pierrel Capo d'Orlando and Varese.

Romel Beck was drafted by the Florida Flame in the first round of the NBDL Draft, and he played for them for a season.  Beck played collegiately at UNLV.

Beck played for the San Antonio Spurs in the 2009 NBA Summer League and recently signed a non-guaranteed contract with the Houston Rockets. He has been subsequently waived.

Beck was leading scorer for the Dakota Wizards of the NBA Development League.

Season 2012–13 he spent in Israeli Basketball Super League with Bnei Herzliya. During the summer of 2013, he played with Leones de Ponce in Puerto Rico. He then returned to Ikaros, but left them in January 2014, and signed with Pioneros de Quintana Roo.

References

External links
National team profile
UNLV profile

1982 births
Living people
Basketball players from California
Basketball players from Sonora
Bnei Hertzeliya basketball players
Correcaminos UAT Victoria players
Dakota Wizards players
Ikaros B.C. players
Lega Basket Serie A players
Leones de Ponce basketball players
Mexican men's basketball players
Mexican expatriate basketball people in the United States
Orlandina Basket players
Pallacanestro Varese players
Pioneros de Quintana Roo players
UNLV Runnin' Rebels basketball players
Small forwards
Shooting guards
Tecolotes UAG players
Mexican expatriate basketball people in Italy